The X3 is an electric multiple unit train used by Arlanda Express on the airport rail link service between Stockholm Central Station and Stockholm Arlanda Airport in Sweden. Alstom built seven of these four-train car units at its Washwood Heath plant in England in 1998/99. The X3 is part of the Alstom Coradia family, and can reach speeds up to 200 km/h.

Overview
The trains are painted white with yellow ends with a Scandinavian designed interior. The units use standard gauge tracks and are fed electricity at  like the rest of the Swedish railway network, but the trains use separate stations at Arlanda and dedicated tracks at Stockholm Central; in both cases, the platforms are higher than at other stations in Sweden, allowing step-free access to the trains without the use of low floors.

References

External links

Arlanda Express web site
Järnväg.net entry on X3 

Alstom Coradia
High-speed trains of Sweden
Multiple units of Sweden
Train-related introductions in 1999
15 kV AC multiple units
Alstom multiple units